Stephen Robert Harvey (born 28 July 1964) is a former English cricketer.  Harvey was a left-handed batsman.  He was born in Little Snoring, Norfolk.

Harvey made his debut for Norfolk in the 1993 Minor Counties Championship against Cambridgeshire.  Harvey played Minor counties cricket for Norfolk from 1993 to 1995, which included 5 Minor Counties Championship matches and a single MCCA Knockout Trophy match.   He made his only List A appearance against Lancashire in the 1995 NatWest Trophy.  In this match, he scored 39 runs before being dismissed by Mike Watkinson.

References

External links
Stephen Harvey at ESPNcricinfo
Stephen Harvey at CricketArchive

1964 births
Living people
People from North Norfolk (district)
English cricketers
Norfolk cricketers
Sportspeople from Norfolk